Thomas Seccombe (1866–1923) was a miscellaneous English writer and, from 1891 to 1901, assistant editor of the Dictionary of National Biography, in which he wrote over 700 entries. A son of physician and episcopus vagans John Thomas Seccombe, he was educated at Felsted and Balliol College, Oxford, taking a first in Modern History in 1889.

Works
(editor) Twelve Bad Men: Original Studies of Eminent Scoundrels (1894)
The Age of Johnson (1899)
The Age of Shakespeare (with John William Allen (1865–1944), 1903)
Bookman History of English Literature (with W. Robertson Nicoll, 1905–6)
In Praise of Oxford (1910)
Scott Centenary Articles (with W. P. Ker, George Gordon, W. H. Hutton, Arthur McDowall, and R. S. Rait, 1932)
The Dictionary of National Biography (assistant editor)

References

 Cousin, John W. A Short Biographical Dictionary of English Literature. 1910.
 

Attribution

External links

 
 
 
 
 A Guide to the Thomas Seccombe correspondence, NC829. Special Collections, University Libraries, University of Nevada, Reno.

English non-fiction writers
1866 births
1923 deaths
English male non-fiction writers